Melbourne tram route 30 is operated by Yarra Trams on the Melbourne tram network from St Vincent's Plaza to Central Pier. The  route is operated out of Southbank depot with A and E class trams.

History
Route 30 was first allocated to the line between City (Spencer Street) to Brunswick Street (St Vincent's Plaza) via La Trobe Street on 25 September 1972. Prior to that, trams running the La Trobe Street shuttle usually ran without numbers. Most of the trams routes that ran via Brunswick Street or Victoria Parade also had peak-hour variants that would terminate at the La Trobe Street (for example route 23 and 24). For most of its operation, route 30 had never had a weekend or an evening service (services ending at 18:00).

In 1995, route 34 commenced operation between City (La Trobe Street) and East Melbourne, and operated during off-peak hours (10:00 to 15:30). Route 30 became peak-only following this point. Route 34 was discontinued from regular service on 19 September 2003, and route 30 began operating off-peak again. On 4 January 2005, route 30 was extended to Waterfront City along Harbour Esplanade and Docklands Drive, with the opening of the Docklands Drive tram extension. Route 30 started terminating in its current location in Harbour Esplanade at Central Pier in July 2008, with route 86 being extended to Waterfront City.

The line along La Trobe Street between Spencer Street (Stop 1) and St Vincent's Plaza (Stop 12) was opened by the Melbourne & Metropolitan Tramways Board on 15 January 1951. On 19 June 1973, a siding was installed just east of St Vincent's Plaza in order to allow route 12 and route 30 trams to shunt out of the way of through-running trams. As part of the Docklands redevelopment project, tram tracks along La Trobe Street were extended west over the Spencer Street railyards on 26 March 2000. On 4 January 2005, the Docklands Drive tram extension opened. Route 30 initially terminated at Waterfront City following this point, but swapped termini with route 86 on 28 July 2008.

On 1 January 2019, the operation of route 30 was extended to evenings and weekends for the first time. 

Between 13 July and 7 November 2020, route 30 was temporarily replaced by route 12, which was diverted via La Trobe Street from Collins Street. On 8 November 2020, route 30 recommenced operations, with E class trams commencing operation on the route. During the 2022 Australian Open between 17 January and 30 January 2022, route 30 was again temporarily replaced by a diverted route 12 along La Trobe Street.

Route

Route 30 runs from the St Vincent's Plaza, East Melbourne west on Victoria Parade then via La Trobe Street to Central Pier.

Operation
Route 30 is operated out of Southbank depot with A and E class trams. In September 2003 operation of the route was transferred from Kew depot to Southbank. It was operated by W class trams until 23 December 2014. Until January 2019, Route 30 was the only tram route on the network that neither operated at night nor on weekends.

Route map

References

External links

030
030